Zamperini is an Italian surname that may refer to:
 Alessandro Zamperini (born 1982), Italian football player
 Louis Zamperini (1917–2014), American Olympic distance runner, US Air Forces Captain and inspirational speaker
 Zamperini Field, an airport in California, U.S., named after Louis

Italian-language surnames